Bishop Hill is a village in Henry County, Illinois, United States, along the South Edwards River. The population was 128 at the 2010 census, up from 125 in 2000. It is the home of the Bishop Hill State Historic Site, a park operated by the Illinois Historic Preservation Agency.

Geography

Bishop Hill is located at  (41.200711, -90.118327).

History

Erik Jansson

The village was founded in 1846 by Swedish immigrants affiliated with the Pietist movement, led by Erik Jansson. Prior to founding the Bishop Hill Colony, Jansson preached to his followers in Sweden about what he considered to be the abominations of the Lutheran Church and emphasized the doctrine that the faithful were without sin. As Jansson's ideas became more radical, he began to lose support from many of his sympathizers and was forced to leave Sweden in the midst of growing persecution. Jansson had previously sent Olof Olsson, a trusted follower, as an emissary to the United States to find a suitable location where the Janssonists could set up a utopian community centered on their religious beliefs. According to Jansson, this community would become the "New Jerusalem", and their beliefs would soon spread across the world. As a result, 1400 colonists emigrated from Sweden to their new home in western Illinois.

The colony struggled early on after its founding. Many of the first 1000 colonists died from disease on the way to Bishop Hill (named for Eric Jansson's birthplace, Biskopskulla ), while others became disillusioned and stayed in New York. The quarters in Bishop Hill were cold and crowded and food was scarce. After the first winter, life at the colony began to improve. By 1849, Bishop Hill had constructed a flour mill, two sawmills, a three-story frame church, and various other buildings. The Bishop Hill Colony was communistic in nature, as dictated by Jansson. Thus, everything was owned by everyone and no one had more possessions than another. Work in the colony was highly rigorous and regimented. It wasn't uncommon to see hundreds of people working together in the fields or large groups of laborers engaged in other tasks.

After Jansson and today

The Bishop Hill colony underwent a major upheaval in 1850 after the murder of Erik Jansson. Jansson was assassinated by a former colony member, John Root, who was upset with Jansson for interfering with his marriage to one of Jansson's cousins. After their leader's death, the people of Bishop Hill appointed a group of seven trustees to run the affairs of the colony. Among the trustees were Jonas Olsson and Olof Johnson, who would become the primary leaders of the colony as they had been two of Jansson's closest aides. Under these two men and the rest of the trustees, the colony continued to grow and flourish. The workforce was reorganized to become more efficient and more buildings were erected. However, despite Bishop Hill's success, in 1857 financial problems arose in the midst of accusations of mismanagement against Olof Johnson. Johnson had made several large investments, without colony approval, that had turned out to be disastrous. As Bishop Hill headed for financial ruin, colonists voted to end the communal system. In 1861 the formal dissolution of the colony was official, and many of its people would soon be forced to move away.

The Janssonist emigrants were a significant group of men and women to move from Sweden to the United States.  Letters home from Janssonists to their friends and family, telling of the fertile agricultural land in the interior of North America, stimulated substantial migration for several decades and contributed to the formation of the Swedish-American ethnic community of the American Midwest.

Descendants of Erik Jansson still lived in the colony until December 20, 2004 when Erik's great-great grandson and Bishop Hill volunteer fireman Theodore Arthur Myhre Sr. died south of the Colony while on a fire service call.  Other known descendants remain in Illinois.

Surviving buildings built by the Janssonists are listed on the National Register of Historic Places.  Bishop Hill is interpreted as a living community of Swedish-American heritage. Due to state budget cuts the Bishop Hill State Historic Site was closed for nearly 5 months from December 1, 2008 to April 23, 2009. Today the Site is open Wednesday to Friday during normal business hours.

Demographics

As of the census of 2000, there were 125 people, 56 households, and 38 families residing in the village. The racial makeup of the village was 100.00% White. Hispanic or Latino of any race were 0.80% of the population. 26.9% were of Swedish, 15.1% American, 14.3% English, 14.3% German, 7.6% Italian and 5.9% Polish ancestry according to Census 2000.

There were 56 households, out of which 23.2% had children under the age of 18 living with them, 60.7% were married couples living together, 7.1% had a female householder with no husband present, and 30.4% were non-families. 28.6% of all households were made up of individuals, and 14.3% had someone living alone who was 65 years of age or older. The average household size was 2.23 and the average family size was 2.69.

In the village, the population was spread out, with 18.4% under the age of 18, 7.2% from 18 to 24, 16.0% from 25 to 44, 38.4% from 45 to 64, and 20.0% who were 65 years of age or older. The median age was 48 years. For every 100 females, there were 89.4 males. For every 100 females age 18 and over, there were 88.9 males.

The median income for a household in the village was $47,083, and the median income for a family was $50,000. Males had a median income of $38,214 versus $18,750 for females. The per capita income for the village was $26,145. None of the population and none of the families were below the poverty line.

2010 Census
According to the 2010 Census, the population was 128, all of which were White, none of whom were Hispanic or Latino (of any race)

Notable person

 Hick Cady, catcher for the Boston Red Sox and Philadelphia Phillies

References

Further reading 
 Mikkelsen, Michael A. "The Bishop Hill Colony: A Religious Communistic Settlement  in Henry County, Illinois." Church and State Columbus And America. Baltimore, MD: The Johns Hopkins Press, 1892. 11–80.
 Wagner, Jon. "Eric Jannson and the Bishop Hill Colony." America's Communal Utopias.  Ed. Donald Pitzer. North Carolina: University of North Carolina Press, 1997. 297–318.
 Hallström, Jan Erik "The Patriarch from Helsingland - Jonas Olson of Bishop Hill. Early Swedish emigration to America", 2017

External links
Bishop Hill information
Bishop Hill
Henry County Historical Society

Populated places established in 1846
Villages in Henry County, Illinois
Villages in Illinois
Utopian communities in the United States
Swedish migration to North America
1846 establishments in Illinois